The Living Prairie Museum is a  tall grass prairie preserve located between Daisy Road and Harcourt Street, east of Ness Avenue in the St. James-Assiniboia suburb of Winnipeg, Manitoba.

It was discovered in 1968 when two botanists from a local sub-committee of the International Biological Program surveyed Manitoba for native prairie plant communities. Of more than 60 sites that were researched, only four were found uncultivated. One of the largest undisturbed sites was discovered in a residential area of Winnipeg. Today a vestige of this original prairie community has been set aside as a City of Winnipeg Nature Park, called the Living Prairie Museum.

The Living Prairie Museum is home to over 160 species of prairie grasses and wildflowers, as well as a great array of prairie wildlife. In Manitoba only 1/20 of 1% of original tall grass prairie remains. The Living Prairie Museum is one of the few preserves of this once vast ecosystem. This museum is defined by the historical interpretation of the tall grass prairie of the Winnipeg Region.

The museum has an interpretative centre with displays on prairie history and ecology as well as an interactive art installation by Winnipeg artist Collin Zipp, titled lost_landscape.

History 
The City of St. James-Assiniboia set aside set aside  of virgin land untouched by urban development in Assiniboia, Manitoba, a suburb of Winnipeg to create the Living Prairie Museum in 1970. Preserving the land, it was projected to cost $90,000 over the 1970-1980/82 time period to maintain the space. The Report to St. James-Assiniboia Council at the time said:The importance of the St. James prairie as a sample of original vegetation can hardly be over-emphasized. More than 125 plant species have already been found on the site, and it is probable that others occur.

Many of these are endangered species in Manitoba, for each year many natural areas disappear through agriculture and urbanization.

A sod turning ceremony, attended by new Governor General Jules Leger took place in late April 1974. The Interpretive Centre was opened on June 23, 1976.

A year later, a group of residents lobbied to have an additional , at the time zoned as Industrial, be added to the Living Prairie Museum.

In the 1960s Metro planned the Western Freeway to cut through the Living Prairie Museum. Residents suggested it be built further north, before the project was cancelled.

Affiliations
The museum is affiliated with CMA, CHIN, and Virtual Museum of Canada.

References

External links
Living Prairie Museum
Living Prairie Virtual Museum
Friends of Living Prairie

Museums in Winnipeg
Nature centres in Manitoba
Natural history museums in Canada
Parks in Winnipeg
Grasslands of Canada
St. James, Winnipeg